The Servant is a 1989 Soviet drama film directed by Vadim Abdrashitov. It was entered into the 39th Berlin International Film Festival where it won the Alfred Bauer Prize.

Cast
 Oleg Borisov as Andrei Andreyevich Gudionov
 Yury Belyayev as Pavel Sergeyevich Klyuev
 Irina Rozanova as Maria
 Aleksei Petrenko as Roman Romanovich Bryzgin
 Aleksandr Tereshko as Valery
 Larisa Shakhvorostova as Daughter-in-law (as Larisa Totunova)
 Irina Cherichenko as Chorus girl
 Valeri Novikov as Father Vasily
 Mikhail Yanushkevich as watchmaker
 Vyacheslav Zharikov as mechanic
 Felix Antipov as Mikhail

References

External links

1989 films
1980s Russian-language films
1989 drama films
Films directed by Vadim Abdrashitov
Soviet drama films